Many compound materials exhibit polymorphism, that is they can exist in different structures called polymorphs. Silicon carbide (SiC) is unique in this regard as more than 250 polymorphs of silicon carbide had been identified by 2006, with some of them having a lattice constant as long as 301.5 nm, about one thousand times the usual SiC lattice spacings.

The polymorphs of SiC include various amorphous phases observed in thin films and fibers, as well as a large family of similar crystalline structures called polytypes. They are variations of the same chemical compound that are identical in two dimensions and differ in the third. Thus, they can be viewed as layers stacked in a certain sequence. The atoms of those layers can be arranged in three configurations, A, B or C, to achieve closest packing. The stacking sequence of those configurations defines the crystal structure, where the unit cell is the shortest periodically repeated sequence of the stacking sequence. This description is not unique to SiC, but also applies to other binary tetrahedral materials, such as zinc oxide and cadmium sulfide.

Categorizing the polytypes

A shorthand has been developed to catalogue the vast number of possible polytype crystal structures: Let us define three SiC bilayer structures (that is 3 atoms with two bonds in between in the illustrations below) and label them as A, B and C. Elements A and B do not change the orientation of the bilayer (except for possible rotation by 120°, which does not change the lattice and is ignored hereafter); the only difference between A and B is shift of the lattice. Element C, however, twists the lattice by 60°.

Using those A,B,C elements, we can construct any SiC polytype. Shown above are examples of the hexagonal polytypes 2H, 4H and 6H as they would be written in the Ramsdell notation where the number indicates the layer and the letter indicates the Bravais lattice. The 2H-SiC structure is equivalent to that of wurtzite and is composed of only elements A and B stacked as ABABAB. The 4H-SiC unit cell is two times longer, and the second half is twisted compared to 2H-SiC, resulting in ABCB stacking. The 6H-SiC cell is three times longer than that of 2H, and the stacking sequence is ABCACB. The cubic 3C-SiC, also called β-SiC, has ABC stacking.

Physical properties

The different polytypes have widely ranging physical properties. 3C-SiC has the highest electron mobility and saturation velocity because of reduced phonon scattering resulting from the higher symmetry. The band gaps differ widely among the polytypes ranging from 2.3 eV for 3C-SiC to 3 eV in 6H SiC to 3.3 eV for 2H-SiC. In general, the greater the wurtzite component, the larger the band gap. Among the SiC polytypes, 6H is most easily prepared and best studied, while the 3C and 4H polytypes are attracting more attention for their superior electronic properties. The polytypism of SiC makes it nontrivial to grow single-phase material, but it also offers some potential advantages - if crystal growth methods can be developed sufficiently then heterojunctions of different SiC polytypes can be prepared and applied in electronic devices.

Summary of polytypes
All symbols in the SiC structures have a specific meaning: The number 3 in 3C-SiC refers to the three-bilayer periodicity of the stacking (ABC) and the letter C denotes the cubic symmetry of the crystal. 3C-SiC is the only possible cubic polytype. The wurtzite ABAB... stacking sequence is denoted as 2H-SiC, indicating its two-bilayer stacking periodicity and hexagonal symmetry. This periodicity doubles and triples in 4H- and 6H-SiC polytypes. The family of rhombohedral polytypes is labeled R, for example, 15R-SiC.

See also
Silicon carbide fibers

References

External links
 A Brief History of Silicon Carbide Dr J F Kelly, University of London
 Material Safety Data Sheet for Silicon Carbide

Carbides
Polymorphism (materials science)